Wong Ting-chung,  (born 14 October 1961) is a Hong Kong entrepreneur. He is the chairman and chief executive of the Nameson Holdings Limited, the chairman of the New Territories Commercial and Industrial General Association and the advisor to the Heung Yee Kuk. He is also the Hong Kong deputy to the National People's Congress.

Wong graduated from Hong Kong Yee Tong Ye College in 1978. He established his business through Hang Cheong Knitting Factory, a factory engaged in the production of knitwear products, in 1982 and established of Nameson Group’s business through Nameson Industrial in September 1990.

He was awarded Bronze Bauhinia Star in 2011 and made Justice of Peace in 2015. In 2011, he was elected Hong Kong deputy to the National People's Congress and was re-elected in 2017.

References

1961 births
Living people
Delegates to the 12th National People's Congress from Hong Kong
Delegates to the 13th National People's Congress from Hong Kong
Hong Kong businesspeople
Recipients of the Bronze Bauhinia Star